Puntland Star is a news agency organization based in Garowe, the capital city of Puntland State of Somalia.

History
Puntland Star was established in 2014 by Somali Scholars. This website publishes daily instant breaking news alerts and the most talked about stories and documentaries and analysis in both Somali and English, with an emphasis on Puntland affairs.

See also
Horseed Media
Garowe Online
Puntland Post

Notes

References
Puntland Star info - webstatsdomain.org
 Puntland Star profile - MondoTimes.com

2014 establishments in Somalia
Mass media in Garowe
Mass media in Somalia
Mass media companies of Somalia